The Pecos Kid is a 1935 American Western film directed by Harry L. Fraser.

Plot summary 
Land Baron James Grayson and his gang steal the Pecos' family Rancho and kill the male adults, leaving young Donald still alive.  Years later, Donald re-appears as the Pecos Kid to face down Grayson and his gang to get his family land back, along with a gold mine.

Cast 
Fred Kohler, Jr. as Donald Pecos / The Pecos Kid
Ruth Findlay as Mary Evans
Roger Williams as James Grayson
Ed Cassidy as Doc Evans
Hal Taliaferro as Eric Grayson
Earl Dwire as Jose
Francis Walker as Henchman Chuck

References

External links 

1935 films
American black-and-white films
1935 Western (genre) films
American Western (genre) films
Commodore Pictures films
1930s English-language films
1930s American films